Kun-e Espid (also Romanized as Kūn-e Espīd and Koon Espid; also known as Kohneh Sefīd, Kon-e Sefīd, Kūhneh Sefīd, and Kūn Asfīd) is a village in Olya Tayeb Rural District, in the Central District of Landeh County, Kohgiluyeh and Boyer-Ahmad Province, Iran. At the 2006 census, its population was 192, in 34 families.

References 

Populated places in Landeh County